The 2004 British Superbike season is the 17th British Superbike Championship season

Calendar

Entry list

Riders Standings

Privateers Standings

References

External links
 The official website of the British Superbike Championship

British
British Superbike Championship
Superbike